The Ottawa Humane Society (1888 to present) is the humane society for Ottawa, Ontario, Canada.

Background

The Ottawa Humane Society is a non-profit organization, community-based organization and a registered charitable organization, Charity Registration Number: # 123264715 RR0001.  The Board of Directors is voluntary.

A group of women formed the Women's Humane Society of Ottawa in January 1888. This organization enforced the new animal protection laws and focused on bettering the lives of neglected children by lobbying for legislation to provide for foster homes.  In 1896, this group evolved into the Ottawa Humane Society, with the newly established Children's Aid Society assisting the needy children within the community.

In 1933 the organization began providing stray animal shelter services to the City of Ottawa. They still hold the municipal contract for stray animal shelter services.

In 1979, the Ottawa Humane Society was renamed the Humane Society of Ottawa-Carleton. The organization returned to the name Ottawa Humane Society in 2001, when the Ottawa-Carleton area was amalgamated.

Today, the Ottawa Humane Society's mandate covers a broad spectrum of animal welfare concerns. The organization's priorities include public education and pet population control, through which we seek to reduce the number of stray animals whose final solution is often destruction. The OHS provides a wealth of animal care information to the public through humane education visits, public information awareness booths, participation in various volunteer programs and the multitude of services offered to the community.

Mission statement
The Ottawa Humane Society Mission Statement is as follows:

Status
The Ottawa Humane Society is an "open admission" animal shelter, which means they do not restrict the types of animals they accept.  It also accepts any number of animals regardless of their age, temperament, or space limitations within the shelter.

See also
Canadian Federation of Humane Societies

References

Further reading
Astroff, Vivian "Helping Hands: The Humane Society of Ottawa-Carleton, The First 100 Years of Caring for the Abused and Abandoned, 1888-1988" Humane Society of Ottawa-Carleton Ottawa, Ontario, Call Number  365.A.30.0

External links

Animal charities based in Canada
Organizations based in Ottawa
Organizations established in 1888
1888 establishments in Ontario